Josif Jovan Bageri (15 August 186815 June 1915) was an educator, poet and Albanian nationalist figure.

Biography

Early life
Josif Bageri was born in Nistrovo in the Upper Reka region, Kosovo Vilayet, Ottoman Empire, to an Albanian Orthodox family. As a young man he emigrated to Sofia, Bulgaria where he found work as a cobbler and became interested in the Albanian nationalist movement.

Albanian National Awakening
In January 1893, Bageri was a founding member of the Dëshira (The Desire) cultural society there, and was profoundly moved by a meeting with the dying Rilindja poet, Naim Frashëri in Istanbul in late 1899. Bageri recognised education as the key to the Albanian nationalist awakening and was active, particularly in the year 1905-1907, in promoting Albanian-language schools and learning. His son, Kristo Bageri, was killed in 1906 in Macedonia as a participant in an IMORO detachment.

From May 1909 to 1911, Bageri published a fortnightly Albanian-language newspaper in Sofia called Shqypeja e Shqypenis / Albanski orel (The Albanian Eagle), an organ for politics and knowledge.

Later life and death
 
After Albanian independence in 1912, Bageri moved to Durrës where he edited the national weekly Ushtimi i Krujës / L'Echo de Croya (The Kruja Echo), a four-page newspaper that appeared in Albanian and French from 1 November 1913 to 1914. He died in Pristina in 1916, apparently on a journey back to Sofia. Bageri was the author of poetry, prose, political articles, comments and polemics. He is remembered in particular for the anthology Kopësht Malsori (Highlander's Garden) in Sofia, 1910.

Legacy
Bageri is an important figure within the Orthodox Albanian community of Upper Reka, which has instituted an association in Bageri's name.

The "Shoqata Josif Bageri" organization, created by Branko Manoilovski and Branislav Sinadinovski, is named in his honor and centered in his town. The organization aims to follow Bageri's work in Albanian National Awakening for the regional Albanian Orthodox in Macedonia.

References

Albanians in North Macedonia
Activists of the Albanian National Awakening
Albanian Christians
Albanian male poets
Albanian poets
Albanian expatriates in Bulgaria
Albanians from the Ottoman Empire
1870 births
1916 deaths
People from Mavrovo and Rostuša Municipality
People from Manastir vilayet